Alexander Sheriff de Moro Clunes (17 May 1912 – 13 March 1970) was an English actor and theatrical manager.

Among the plays he presented were Christopher Fry's The Lady's Not For Burning. He gave the actor and dramatist Peter Ustinov his first break with his production The House of Regrets. His film career was brief, but varied. He played Hastings in Laurence Olivier's Richard III (1955), and also appeared in wartime films such as One of Our Aircraft Is Missing (1942), although he was in fact a conscientious objector. He also appeared in The Adventures of Quentin Durward (1955).

Clunes' later stage work included succeeding Rex Harrison as Henry Higgins in the stage musical My Fair Lady in 1959. His final stage appearance was in 1968.

Early and personal life 

Alexander Sheriff de Moro Clunes was born on 17 May 1912 to a show business family, he was the son of Alexander Sydenham Sherriff Clunes (1881–1960) and Georgina Ada Sumner (1882–1969). He began his stage career with Ben Greet's company before playing at the Old Vic theatre in 1934. He played numerous Shakespearian roles, before taking over the management of the Arts Theatre, London in 1942, where he remained until 1950. He later ran a theatre bookshop in Cecil Court.

He was twice married: to actress Stella Richman, later a television producer, and Daphne Gillian Acott, with whom he had one son, actor Martin Clunes.

Alec Clunes died from lung cancer on 13 March 1970, aged 57. He left a widow, his son, and a daughter, Amanda Clunes.

Notable TV guest appearances 
 Undermind playing "Police Sergeant" in episode: "Onset of Fear" (episode No. 1.1) 24 April 1965
 The Ronnie Barker Playhouse playing "Peregrine" in episode: "The Incredible Mister Tanner" (episode No. 1.4) 24 April 1968

Clunes played Governor Woodes Rogers, the lead in the first three episodes of The Buccaneers in 1956. He was also offered the lead part of Professor Bernard Quatermass in the famous BBC science-fiction serial Quatermass and the Pit in 1958, but declined the role (André Morell was cast instead).

Filmography

References

External links 
 
 Alec Clunes in The Buccaneers (Episode #1) at Archive.org

1912 births
1970 deaths
20th-century English businesspeople
20th-century English male actors
Deaths from lung cancer in England
English conscientious objectors
English film producers
English male Shakespearean actors
English male stage actors
English theatre managers and producers
Male actors from London
People from Brixton